Glen White is a census-designated place (CDP) in Raleigh County, West Virginia, United States. Glen White had a post office (now closed) with ZIP code 25849. As of the 2010 census, its population is 266.

The community derives its name from E. E. White, the proprietor of a local coal mine.

References

Census-designated places in Raleigh County, West Virginia
Census-designated places in West Virginia
Coal towns in West Virginia